The Oklahoma Music Hall of Fame, located in Muskogee, Oklahoma, honors Oklahoma musicians for their lifetime achievements in music. The induction ceremony and concert are held each year in Muskogee. Since its establishment in 1997, the Hall of Fame has inducted more than 100 individuals or groups, held numerous concerts, and renovated in part the facility that will educate Oklahomans for generations about those innovators and industry icons from Oklahoma.

History
In 1996, the Oklahoma Legislature began the vision for the Hall of Fame. State Senator Benn Robinson (D-Muskogee) and State Representative Barbara Staggs (D-Muskogee) co-authored a concurrent resolution designating Muskogee as the site of the Oklahoma Music Hall of Fame. State Representative Bill Settle (D-Muskogee) continued to champion the cause by securing legislative appropriations that served to further promote the Oklahoma Music Hall of Fame. In 1997, Friends of Oklahoma Music was incorporated to serve as producer for annual induction ceremony events. In that same year, Friends of Oklahoma Music hosted and produced the first Oklahoma Music Hall of Fame Induction Ceremony and Concert at the Muskogee Civic Center. Two years later, in 1999, Governor of Oklahoma Frank Keating created the Oklahoma Music Hall of Fame Board and appointed seven members to facilitate fundraising, site selection, and construction of a facility honoring the history and legacy of Oklahoma's music, which has contributed so much to the history and roots of American music.

In 2003, Friends of Oklahoma Music entered into a long-term lease agreement with the City of Muskogee and completed phase one of renovation to The Frisco Freight Depot, an old train depot. In October 2003, Friends and The Oklahoma Music Hall of Fame moved their offices into the Depot, which is the site of the future Oklahoma Music Hall of Fame Museum. In 2004, Friends of Oklahoma Music was renamed Oklahoma Music Hall of Fame Foundation. Then in 2005, the Hall of Fame assumed its current name by being renamed Oklahoma Music Hall of Fame & Museum.

Inductees

1997
Merle Haggard
Woody Guthrie
Patti Page
Claude Williams

1998
 Gene Autry
 Albert E. Brumley
 David Gates
 Jay McShann

1999
Byron Berline
Vince Gill
Barney Kessel
KVOO

2000
Roy Clark
Color Me Badd
Wanda Jackson
The Oklahoma City Blue Devils
Jim Halsey

2001
Leona Mitchell
Caddo Nation
The Texas Playboys
Bob Wills
Johnnie Lee Wills
Billy Jack Wills
Luke Wills

2002
Hank Thompson
Joe Diffie
Kay Starr
Charlie Christian

2003
Ronnie Dunn
Benny Garcia Jr.
Flash Terry
D.C. Minner
John Wooley
Lee Wiley
Keith Anderson—Rising Star Award

2004
Dr. Louis Ballard
Merle Kilgore
Roger Miller

2005
Tommy Allsup
Cain's Ballroom
Toby Keith
Billy Parker
Carrie Underwood—Rising Star Award

2006
Leon Russell
Mel McDaniel
Carl Radle
Eldon Shamblin
Barbara Staggs

2007
Hoyt Axton
Mae Boren Axton
Tommy Crook
Cal Smith
Sammi Smith
Hinder—Rising Star Award

2008
Bob Childers
Chick Rains
The All-American Rejects—Rising Star Award
Cherokee National Youth Choir
Wichita and Affiliated Tribes

2009
Carrie Underwood
Ramona Reed
Rocky Frisco
C.H. Parker

2010
Jean Shepard
Les Gilliam
Sam Harris
Jamie Oldaker

2011
Kristin Chenoweth
Gene Triplett
Nole "Nokie" Edwards 
Cheevers Toppah
Jesse Ed Davis
Wayman Tisdale
Ralph Blane
Robert Lenard "Bob" Bogle
Kings of Leon—Rising Star Award

2013
Jimmy Webb
Mason Williams
Sandi Patty
Norma Jean Beasler
Neal Schon
Barbara McAlister
Mabee Center
Bob Dunn
Thompson Square—Rising Star Award
The Swon Brothers—Rising Star Award
Roger Davis

2015
Restless Heart
Tim DuBois
Scott Hendricks
Becky Hobbs
Smiley Weaver

2016
B.J. Thomas

2017
Bill Grant
Hanson
Rodney Lay
Red Dirt Rangers
David Teegarden Sr.
Jimmy Markham
Carl Belew
Jimmy LaFave

2018
Cassie Gaines
Steve Gaines
Point of Grace
Smokie Norful
Dennis Jernigan
Jody Miller
Gail Davies
Gayle Peevey
Katrina Elam
Gus Hardin
Lorrie Collins
Kellie Coffey
Evelyn Pittman
Molly Bee
Michael Brewer

2019
Molly Bee
Michael Brewer
Kellie Coffey
Lorrie Collins
Gail Davies
Katrina Elam
Gus Hardin
Jody Miller
Gayla Peevey
Evelyn LaRue Pittman

2020
David Osborne
Kelly Lang
Don Byas
Wade Hayes
Mike Settle

2021
Scott Musick (The Call)
Steve Huddleston (The Call)
Michael Been (The Call)
Jerry Lynn Williams
Ann Bell
Tommy Collins

2022
Randy Crouch
Mike McClure
Don White
Don Byas

See also
 List of music museums

References

External links
Oklahoma Music Hall of Fame website

Halls of fame in Oklahoma
Music halls of fame
State halls of fame in the United States
Music museums in Oklahoma
Museums in Muskogee County, Oklahoma
Buildings and structures in Muskogee, Oklahoma
Awards established in 1997
Tourist attractions in Muskogee, Oklahoma